Christoffersen is a Danish-Norwegian patronymic surname, literally meaning son of Christoffer, the North Germanic form of the Greek given name Χριστόφορος, Christóphοros. There are two less common spelling variants Kristoffersen and Christophersen; they have identical pronunciation. In Denmark, the three spelling variants are the 53rd, 83rd, and 205th (respectively) most popular surnames. In Norway, Kristoffersen is the commoner form, but Christoffersen is also found. Occurrence of the surname outside Denmark, Norway and Schleswig-Holstein is due to migration. Immigrants to English-speaking countries sometimes changed the spelling to Christofferson, Kristofferson, or Christopherson.

People
Asmund Kristoffersen (born 1944), Norwegian politician
Christin Kristoffersen (born 1973), Norwegian politician
D. Todd Christofferson (born 1945), American religious leader
David Christopherson (born 1954), Canadian politician
Debra Christofferson (born 1963), U.S. actress
Dorthe Kristoffersen (1906–1976), Greenlandic sculptor
Eric Christoffersen of Denmark (c. 1307 – early 1332), Danish junior king 
Frank Christopherson Jr. (1927-2020), American politician
Hans Christian Christoffersen (1882–1966), Norwegian chess player
Henning Christophersen (born 1939), Danish politician, vice-president of the European Commission 1985–1995
Henrik Kristoffersen (born 1994), Norwegian alpine skier
Hjalmar Christoffersen (1889–1966), Danish amateur footballer
John Christopherson (died 1558) was Chaplain and confessor
John Christophersen (1951–2021), Aboriginal Australian activist, father of Nova Peris and council member of the Northern Land Council 
John Christopherson (cricketer) (1909–1999), English cricketer
John Brian Christopherson (1868–1955), British physician
Julian Kristoffersen (born 1997), Norwegian footballer
K'itura Kristoffersen (born 1939), Greenlandic sculptor
Kris Kristofferson (born 1936), U.S. country music songwriter, singer and actor
Lone Kristoffersen (born 1961), Danish female curler
Percy Christopherson (1866–1921), English cricketer
Peter Christopherson (1955-2010), British musician
Quinn Christopherson, American singer-songwriter
Sara Kristoffersen (1937–2008), Greenlandic sculptor
Scott Christopherson (born 1989), American basketball player
Stanley Christopherson (1861–1949), English cricketer
Thies Christophersen (1918–1997), German Holocaust denier

Places
 Christoffersen Heights, Ellsworth Land, Antarctica
 Christoffersen Island, South Orkney Islands, Antarctica

See also
 Kristofferson (disambiguation)

References

Danish-language surnames
Norwegian-language surnames
Patronymic surnames
Surnames from given names